The bust of Bernardino Rivadavia is installed in Cholula, Puebla, Mexico.

References

External links

 

Busts in Mexico
Monuments and memorials in Puebla
Outdoor sculptures in Cholula, Puebla
Sculptures of men in Mexico